The 2017 Duquesne Dukes football team represented Duquesne University in the 2017 NCAA Division I FCS football season. They were led by 13th-year head coach Jerry Schmitt and played their home games at Arthur J. Rooney Athletic Field. They were a member of the Northeast Conference. They finished the season 7–4, 4–2 in NEC play to finish in a tie for second place.

Schedule

Source: Schedule

References

Duquesne
Duquesne Dukes football seasons
Duquesne Dukes football